Secure Data Recovery Services provides data recovery and digital forensics services for a range of storage media, including laptop and desktop computer storage drives, HDD, SSD, RAID arrays, mobile devices, legacy storage systems, digital cameras, flash USB drives, and flash memory cards.

History
Secure Data Recovery Services began operations in 2007 with the establishment of its first lab facility in Los Angeles, California. Additional labs in Cleveland, Ohio and Toronto, Ontario in Canada, soon followed, each with Class 10 ISO 4 cleanrooms and advanced data security standards and certifications. The company now provides professional data recovery services to companies and organizations around the world.

Secure Data Recovery began offering digital forensics services in 2014, and the company added new products and services including several do-it-yourself Windows-based data recovery software solutions in 2016.

Secure Data Recovery Services maintains more than 250 business partnerships across North America, including the B&H Photo NYC Superstore in downtown Manhattan.

Security certifications and practices
Secure Data Recovery Services undergoes audits and evaluations to maintain a range of professional certifications and to ensure compliance with specific federal and international regulations. All data handling practices within Secure Data Recovery labs are SSAE 18 Type II SOC 1, 2, and 3 audited to verify the safe handling of sensitive or protected information.

Data recovery operations take place in a Class 10 ISO 4 cleanroom, which reduces the risk of damage to sensitive internal drive components from airborne dust or other small particulates. Cleanrooms come in different ratings depending on the industry. Class 100 ISO 5 facilities permit 100 particles per square foot and are commonly used for manufacturing applications in the pharmaceutical and biotechnology sectors. Class 10 ISO cleanrooms filter air to no more than 10 particles per square foot. This cleanroom rating is generally given to manufacturers of semiconductors and other sensitive electronics technology.

Secure Data Recovery Services transfers recovered data on portable devices that are FIPS 140-2 Level 3 validated, a U.S. government computer security standard used to approve cryptographic modules. Secure Data Recovery Services is a member of the General Services Administration (GSA) schedule for approved government contractors, and the company provides data recovery services for local, state, and federal government agencies, as well as for all branches of the U.S. military.

Secure Data Recovery Services complies with the EU/U.S. Privacy Shield Framework administered and reviewed by TRUSTe to ensure privacy protection for the exchange of personal data for commercial purposes between the European Union and the United States. They also maintain compliance with the Payment Card Industry Data Security Standard (PCI-DSS) for all customer transactions to ensure the safe handling, storage, and processing of credit card information.

Manufacturer partnerships
Secure Data Recovery Services maintains professional partnerships with several data storage manufacturers to provide specialized data recovery services that do not endanger existing warranties. Secure Data Recovery Services is a Western Digital Platinum Partner. Other manufacturing partnerships include Glyph, Oyen Digital, and Verbatim.

Awards and achievements
Secure Data Recovery Services is a member of ACRBO, the Association of Computer Repair Business Owners. It is also a member within the IEEE, ISSA and PPA Member and, over the years, the company website has posted over one hundred customer testimonial letters.

In 2012, TopTenReviews rated Secure Data Recovery Services with 10 out of 10 points for its features, security, recovery capabilities, and help and support. In 2015 The website awarded Secure Data Recovery Services the TopTenREVIEWS Gold Award for RAID data recovery companies.

In May 2021, Cyber Defence Magazine named Secure Data Recovery Services the market leader for data recovery.

See also

 Data recovery
Digital forensics
Computer forensics
Mobile device forensics
 Error detection and correction
 List of data recovery software
List of data recovery companies
 Statements on auditing standards
 Sarbanes–Oxley Act
Hard disk drive
Solid-state drive
RAID
Virtual machine

References

External links
 
Company Blog

Data recovery companies
Companies established in 1997